mcgarrybowen is an advertising agency founded in 2002 by John McGarry, former president of Young & Rubicam, Stewart Owen, former chief strategic officer of Young & Rubicam, and Gordon Bowen, a former executive creative director at Ogilvy & Mather and Young & Rubicam and who together until 2008 held roughly 90% of the company. mcgarrybowen was acquired for an undisclosed amount by Dentsu in 2008. It currently has offices in New York, Chicago, San Francisco, London, Paris, Amsterdam, Mexico City, Bangalore, Shanghai, Hong Kong, and Düsseldorf.

mcgarrybowen's clients include Maserati, Staples, Intel, American Express, Marriott International,, Chevron, Crayola, Kraft Foods, Disney, JCPenney, Brand USA, and Clorox Specialty Brands.  Until 2008 it was ranked as the largest independent advertising agency in New York and 11th in the U.S., as ranked by AdAge 2005.  Following both agencies' acquisition by Dentsu in 2008, mcgarrybowen became a sibling agency to 360i. mcgarrybowen was named as AdAge Agency of the Year in 2009, and 2011, as well as the No. 2 agency on AdAge Agency A List for 2010.

mcgarrybowen opened their first international office in London in April 2012, following a merger with sister agency Dentsu London, and almost immediately won the £25 million European launch campaign for Honda's fourth-generation CR-V.

Principals

Gordon Bowen, Founder and Global Chairman
Jon Dupuis, Global President
Ida Rezvani, President, NYC
Ryan Lindholm, President, San Francisco
Laurel Stack Flatt, President, Chicago

References

 Advertising Age - http://adage.com/article/special-report-agency-alist-2017/mcgarrybowen-2017-comeback-agency-year/307607/
 Advertising Age - http://adage.com/article/agency-news/american-express-hires-mcgarrybowen-explain-offerings/309335/
 Advertising Age -  http://adage.com/article/cmo-strategy/brita-filter-negativity-twitter/308581/
 Adweek - http://www.adweek.com/brand-marketing/tom-brady-epically-brushes-his-teeth-intels-super-bowl-ad-promoting-replay-technology-175492/

External links
Official web site
Forbes: "The Men in the Gray Flannel Suits"
"New kids on the block  Chicago Sun-Times "

Advertising agencies based in New York City
Dentsu Aegis Network brands
American companies established in 2002
2002 establishments in New York City
2008 mergers and acquisitions
American subsidiaries of foreign companies